Marion Hughes (born 18 May 1968) is an Irish equestrian. She competed in two events at the 2004 Summer Olympics.

References

External links
 

1968 births
Living people
Irish female equestrians
Olympic equestrians of Ireland
Equestrians at the 2004 Summer Olympics
Sportspeople from County Waterford